In telecommunication, a start signal is a signal that prepares a device to receive data or to perform a function. 

In asynchronous serial communication, start signals are used at the beginning of a character that prepares the receiving device for the reception of the code elements. 

A start signal is limited to one signal element usually having the duration of a unit interval.

References

Telecommunications engineering